The Light welterweight (64 kg) competition at the 2016 AIBA Women's World Boxing Championships was held from 20 to 27 May 2016.

Draw

References
Draw

Light welterweight